The 2006–07 Egyptian Super Cup was the sixth edition of the Egyptian Super Cup, an annual football match between the winners of the previous season's Egyptian Premier League and Egypt Cup. The match is usually contested by the winners of the Premier League and the Egypt Cup, but since Al Ahly won the double (2005–06 Egyptian Premier League and 2005–06 Egypt Cup), ENPPI qualified instead of Zamalek (second-placed in the league and cup), who was prevented from playing the match by decision of the football association. The match was played at the Cairo International Stadium. Al Ahly defended the trophy they won in the previous edition and defeated Enppi 1–0.

Details

References

2006–07 in Egyptian football

Egyptian Super Cup
Al Ahly SC matches
ENPPI SC matches